Donna Sachet is an American drag actor, singer, community activist, and writer based in San Francisco.

Early life 
Born as Kirk Reeves in South Carolina, Sachet attended Vanderbilt University, then she went to New York. A job opportunity brought Reeves to San Francisco. At a San Francisco Gay Men's Chorus event, she lip-synced to a Donna Summer song with a significant swagger which inspired her name.

Career 
Sachet has been awarded many community honors, including serving as Grand Marshal in the San Francisco Pride parade and being named first lady of the Castro district by California Senator Mark Leno. She was elected by the Imperial Court System as the 30th Absolute Empress of San Francisco with Brian C. Benamati in 1995. She recently has served on the boards of the San Francisco LGBT Community Center, the AIDS Emergency Fund, Positive Resource Center, the Imperial Council and the state board of Equality California. She co-chaired the San Francisco GLAAD Media Awards for four years. She currently serves on the International Court Council of the Imperial Court System. Sachet serves as an unofficial liaison for the LGBT and leather communities.

She currently writes a biweekly column for the Bay Area Reporter, writes a quarterly newsletter geared to the LGBT community for the SF Convention & Visitors Bureau, and is the host of "Sunday is a Drag" a female impersonation, brunch show at Harry Denton's Starlight Room in the St Francis Hotel. With Tim Gaskin, she co-hosted a Comcast weekly LGBT television series called OUT Spoken for five years. On September 29, 2009, Sachet became the first drag performer to sing the United States National Anthem at the opening of a Major League Baseball game.

Sachet presided at the lighting ceremony for the Rainbow World Fund's World Tree of Hope in San Francisco City Hall on 10 December 2013.

Donna Sachet had a featured role in a full feature comedy film, My Brother's Shoes.

Awards and honors
 1993 Miss Gay San Francisco by the Imperial Council of San Francisco
 1995 30th Absolute Empress of San Francisco by the Imperial Council of San Francisco
 1995 Darrell Yee Award from AIDS Emergency Fund shared with Brian Benamati
 1996 Cable Car Entertainer of the Year, City of San Francisco
 1997 International Jose Honors Imperial Award
 1998 Interclub Fund's Most Supportive Non-Leather Title Holder
 2000 Alice B. Toklas Lesbian & Gay Democratic Club Community Service Award
 2001 Pollie Award from the American Association of Political Consultants
 2002 Designation as the Leather Empress by the Leather Community
 2004 Sainthood from the Sisters of Perpetual Indulgence
2005 Bob Cramer Humanitarian Award
 2005 San Francisco Police Officers Pride Alliance Award
 2005 Community Grand Marshal of the SF LGBT Pride Parade
 2007 Heritage of Pride Award from the SF LGBT Pride Committee
 2009 Academy of Friends Kile Ozier Founder's Award
 2009 Stonewall 40 TransHeroes

References

External links
 ON Magazine profile
 Donna Sachet, Super Volunteer in Drag
 News in brief: Pride Month at Commonwealth Club
 ABC-7, Profiles of Excellence
 Empresses of San Francisco
 Darrell Yee Award

American LGBT rights activists
American LGBT writers
Place of birth missing (living people)
Year of birth missing (living people)
American drag queens
LGBT people from South Carolina
Living people
21st-century LGBT people
American LGBT comedians